Minhla Township may refer to: 
Minhla Township, Bago
Minhla Township, Magway